Raúl García Escudero (born 11 July 1986) is a Spanish professional footballer who plays for La Liga club Athletic Bilbao mainly as an attacking midfielder or second striker.

Formed at Osasuna, he spent most of his career at Atlético Madrid, scoring 46 goals in 329 games across all competitions over eight seasons and winning six major titles, including the 2014 national championship and the 2010 Europa League. In 2015 he signed with Athletic Bilbao, going on to have an equally lengthy spell and win the 2020–21 Supercopa de España.

García played twice with Spain, making his debut in 2014.

Club career

Osasuna
Born in Pamplona, García played for hometown's CA Osasuna during his first years as a professional. On 24 October 2004, he made his debut for the first team in a 3–0 away defeat against FC Barcelona, with his first chance being offered by Mexican coach Javier Aguirre.

García scored five league goals (the first on 26 October 2005 in a 3–2 home win over Athletic Bilbao) in his first full season as the Navarrese finished in fourth place in La Liga, starting in 28 of his 33 appearances at the age of just 19.

Atlético Madrid
In July 2007, after helping Osasuna to the semi-finals of the UEFA Cup with one goal in 12 games, García signed a five-year contract with Atlético Madrid, reuniting with former boss Aguirre upon the €13 million deal.

In January 2010, García lost his starting position to newly signed Tiago Mendes, who had arrived on loan from Juventus FC. However, he started the UEFA Europa League final against Fulham, as the Portuguese was cup-tied, playing the full 90 minutes and extra time in the 2–1 victory for the first honour of his career; additionally, he appeared in the second half of the Copa del Rey's decider against Sevilla FC, a 2–0 loss.

On 27 August 2010, García featured the entire match in the UEFA Super Cup against Inter Milan, giving away a penalty kick in the last minute for a foul on Goran Pandev; the shot was however saved by David de Gea, and the Colchoneros won it 2–0. Again, he played significantly less minutes than Tiago, but still managed to collect 29 league appearances as Atlético finally qualified to the Europa League, and netted his only goal of the season in a 2–1 home loss to eventual champions Barcelona, heading in from a corner kick.

After renewing his contract for a further three years, García was loaned to former club Osasuna for 2011–12, where he began to appear more prominently as an attacking midfielder. He scored 11 goals during the campaign, including twice against RCD Mallorca – both through headers from corners by Álvaro Cejudo (2–2)– and one in a defeat of Barcelona (3–2), finishing as team top scorer with four more goals than Ibrahima Baldé.

On 9 April 2014, after playing the full 90 minutes in a 1–0 UEFA Champions League home defeat of Barcelona that qualified Atlético Madrid to the semi-finals for the first time in 40 years, García became the club's most capped player in the competition with 22 appearances, surpassing Luis Aragonés. On 19 August he scored a 88th-minute 1–1 equaliser against Real Madrid at the Santiago Bernabéu for the Supercopa de España, as his team went on to win the trophy 2–1 on aggregate and conquer it for the second time in their history.

Athletic Bilbao
On 31 August 2015, after a transfer request, García signed a four-year contract with Athletic Bilbao which included a release clause of €40 million. He scored in his first appearance, helping to a 3–1 home victory over Getafe CF where he featured 79 minutes. 

García made his 100th appearance for the club in October 2017. In late May 2018, after he had scored ten league goals in each of his first two seasons, he and Athletic agreed on a contract extension running to June 2020.

On 20 July 2019, the 33-year-old García agreed to a one-year extension at the San Mamés Stadium until June 2021, with no release clause. He scored a career-best 15 goals that campaign (seven penalties) – entering the league's record books after becoming the first player to find the net in every month of a calendar year – but his team could only finish 11th.

García became only the 11th player in La Liga history to reach 500 games in the competition on 31 December 2020, in a 1–0 home Basque derby loss to Real Sociedad.

International career
From 2006 to 2009, García played with Spain under-21s, earning a total of 20 caps in the category and representing the nation at the 2009 UEFA European Championship, in a group stage exit. He also appeared for the under-19 team.

On 29 August 2014, aged 28, García was named by full side manager Vicente del Bosque in a 23-man squad for matches against France and Macedonia in September. He made his debut on 4 September, starting and playing 58 minutes in a 1–0 friendly loss to the former.

In 2004 and 2005, García played in representative matches for both Navarre and the Basque Country.

Style of play
García was known for scoring from the bench and having good aerial ability. A competent penalty taker, he was also often deployed as a false 9 due to his movements off the ball.

Career statistics

Club

Honours
Atlético Madrid
La Liga: 2013–14
Copa del Rey: 2012–13; runner-up 2009–10
Supercopa de España: 2014; runner-up 2013
UEFA Europa League: 2009–10
UEFA Super Cup: 2010, 2012
UEFA Champions League runner-up: 2013–14

Athletic Bilbao
Supercopa de España: 2020–21
Copa del Rey runner-up: 2019–20, 2020–21

See also
List of Atlético Madrid players (+100)
List of Athletic Bilbao players (+200 appearances)
List of La Liga players (400+ appearances)

Notes

References

External links

1986 births
Living people
Spanish footballers
Footballers from Pamplona
Association football midfielders
Association football forwards
La Liga players
Segunda División B players
CA Osasuna B players
CA Osasuna players
Atlético Madrid footballers
Athletic Bilbao footballers
UEFA Europa League winning players
Spain youth international footballers
Spain under-21 international footballers
Spain international footballers
Basque Country international footballers